Joe Terry (born May 7, 1965) is a retired United States professional American football Linebacker who played one season in the National Football League with the Seattle Seahawks in 1987.

References

1965 births
Living people
American football linebackers
Seattle Seahawks players
Sportspeople from Alameda County, California
Players of American football from California
People from Pleasanton, California
Cal State Hayward Pioneers football players